Wellington Harbour Board Wharf Office Building (also known as Shed 7) is a historic building on Jervois Quay erected by the Wellington Harbour Board in Wellington, New Zealand.

The building, is classified as a "Category 1" ("places of 'special or outstanding historical or cultural heritage significance or value'") historic place by Heritage New Zealand. The building currently houses the New Zealand Academy of Fine Arts and 25 luxurious inner-city apartments.

References

Buildings and structures in Wellington City
Heritage New Zealand Category 1 historic places in the Wellington Region
Frederick de Jersey Clere buildings